Mechum River Farm is an historic manor house and farm located near Charlottesville, Albemarle County, Virginia.  The original house was built about 1820 presumably by a Burch family member, then updated and expanded about 1850 in the Gothic Revival style during the ownership of John C. Burch and Lucinda E. Gay Burch. It is a -story, three bay, brick hall and parlor plan dwelling set on a raised basement with a solid brick foundation and a side gable roof. It features a hipped-roof portico over the central single-leaf entry. It has a rear addition built about 1920 and an extension to that built in 1976.  Also on the property are a contributing barn (c. 1900), shed (c. 1900), wood shed (c. 1920), Delco shed (c. 1900), smokehouse (c. 1820), chicken coop (c. 1850), privy (c. 1850), shed (c. 1850), and family cemetery.

It was added to the National Register of Historic Places in 2007.

References

Houses on the National Register of Historic Places in Virginia
Carpenter Gothic houses in Virginia
Houses completed in 1820
Houses in Albemarle County, Virginia
National Register of Historic Places in Albemarle County, Virginia